Pterallastes is a genus of bee-mimicking hoverflies. So far the genus contains only two species, one in North America and one from the Sichuan province of China.

Species
Pterallastes bettyae Thompson, 1979
Pterallastes bomboides Thompson, 1974
Pterallastes thoracicus Loew, 1863
Pterallastes unicolor (Shiraki, 1930)

References

External links
 Pterallastes thoracicus, American Insects

Hoverfly genera
Taxa named by Hermann Loew
Diptera of North America
Diptera of Asia